League table for teams participating in Ykkönen, the second tier of the Finnish Soccer League system, in 1994.

League table

See also
Veikkausliiga (Tier 1)

References

Ykkönen seasons
2
Finland
Finland